Ballykealy House is a 19th-century great house and former estate in Ballon, County Carlow, Ireland.

History
Ballykealy House, sometimes spelt Ballykealey, was built between 1825 and 1835 for John James Lecky. It is a three story Tudor revival house on a t-shape plan. It was designed by the English architect, Thomas Cobden, who also designed a number of other great houses in County Carlow including Duckett's Grove. The house once sat in an estate of 1,500 acres.

Current Use
In the 1990s, the house was converted to use as a hotel, with an extension being added to accommodate this.

See also
List of country houses in County Carlow

References

Buildings and structures in County Carlow